Loleatta Holloway is the fifth studio album recorded by American singer Loleatta Holloway, released in 1979 on the Gold Mind label.

History 
The album features the single "That's What You Said", which peaked at #30 on the Hot Dance Club Play chart. The album was remastered and reissued with bonus tracks in 2014 by Big Break Records.

Track listing

Personnel 
Roger Hawkins, Scotty Miller, Maurice Jennings – drums
Anthony Willis, Raymond Earl, Bernard Reed – bass
Bobby Womack, T.J. Tindall, Kim Miller, John Bishop – guitars
Bunny Sigler, Patrick Moten, Jimmy Sigler, Dennis Richardson – keyboards
Larry Washington, Emanuel Williams – congas
Bobby Womack, Barbara Ingram, Evette Benton, Carla Benson, The Waters, Patrick Moten – background vocals
The James Mack String Section, Don Renaldo and His Strings and Horns, Patrick Moten and His Strings and Horns – strings
Muscle Shoals Horns – horns

Charts 
Singles

References

External links 
 

1979 albums
Loleatta Holloway albums
Albums produced by Bobby Womack
Albums recorded at Sigma Sound Studios
Gold Mind Records albums